Pulchrocladia corallaizon is a species of lichen in the family Cladoniaceae. It was first formally described as Cladia corallaizon. The specific epithet corallaizon, modified from Greek, means "ever-living coral". In 2018, it was transferred to the newly circumscribed genus Pulchrocladia.

Secondary compounds occurring in the lichen include atranorin, protolichesterinic acid, ursolic acid, and usnic acid. The distribution of Pulchrocladia corallaizon is limited to South Australia and Western Australia.

References

Cladoniaceae
Lichen species
Lichens described in 1970
Lichens of Australia
Taxa named by Rex Bertram Filson